USS Hawaii (SSN-776), a , is the first commissioned warship of the United States Navy to be named for the 50th state. (A previous large cruiser, or battlecruiser,  was launched, but never commissioned, and was named after the Territory of Hawaii.) The building contract was awarded to the Electric Boat Division of General Dynamics Corporation in Groton, Connecticut on 30 September 1998 and her keel was laid down on 27 August 2004. She was christened on 17 June 2006 by her sponsor, Governor Linda Lingle of Hawaii. Electric Boat delivered Hawaii to the US Navy on 22 December 2006, ahead of schedule. 
She was commissioned on 5 May 2007. 
In July 2009, she changed home port from Groton, CT (Submarine Group Two, Submarine Squadron Two) to Pearl Harbor, HI (Submarine Squadron One).

History
 January 2008 – maiden deployment.
 May 2008 – post-shakedown availability.
 4 December 2008 – US Navy announces USS Hawaii will be home ported at Pearl Harbor in 2009.
8 May 2009 – US Navy announces the ship has earned the U.S. Coast Guard Meritorious Unit Commendation for their work in disrupting drug trafficking from 20 February to 17 April 2008.
10 July 2009 – The sub transits the Panama Canal en route to new homeport at Pearl Harbor.
23 July 2009 – The sub reaches Pearl Harbor.
30 March to 5 May 2010 – The sub receives a $2.5 million refit in a drydock in Pearl Harbor.
August 2010 – The boat leaves for her first Western Pacific cruise, under temporarily assignment to Seventh Fleet, making her the first Virginia-class submarine to enter the Western Pacific.
February 2011 – The boat returns from her first Western Pacific cruise.

See also
 List of submarines of the United States Navy
 Submarines in the United States Navy

References 

Fast Facts
This article includes information collected from the Naval Vessel Register and various press releases.

External links 

 US Navy page for USS Hawaii
 USS Hawaii steams into Pearl
 Sub Bearing Our State's Name Arrives Thursday
 Arrival of USS Hawaii heralds new era in Pacific
 More about the USS Hawaii
 USS Hawaii departs for Western Pacific

 

Virginia-class submarines
Nuclear submarines of the United States Navy
Ships built in Groton, Connecticut
2006 ships
Submarines of the United States